Domenico Viva (19 October 1648 – 5 July 1726) was an Italian Jesuit theologian.

Life
He was born at Lecce, and entered the Society of Jesus 12 May 1663. He taught he humanities and Greek, nine years' philosophy, eight years moral theology, eight years' Scholastic theology, was two years prefect of studies, was rector of the College of Naples in 1711, and provincial of Naples.

Works

"Enchiridion", a work relating to the jubilee, especially that of the Holy Year, and in general concerning indulgences;
a course of theology for schools, compiled from his lectures at the college of Naples; 
"Opuscula theologico-moralia", for students;
a course of moral theology. These works are held in are quoted by Alphonsus Liguori, Lacroix, etc.; 
"Trutina theologica damnatarum thesium" (1708), his most famous work, in four parts and two volumes. In the first volume are enumerated the propositions condemned by three popes: 45 by Alexander VII, 65 by Innocent XI, 39 by Alexander VIII, and the five condemned propositions of the Augustinus of Jansenius. The second volume is devoted to the study and refutation of the 101 propositions of Quesnel, condemned by the Bull Unigenitus of Clement XI in 1713. The first volume had been published in 1708 and by 1757 had reached sixteen editions, and in the same period vol. II had gone through six editions. To some editions were added the valuable comments of Father Antonio Zaccharia, librarian of the House of Este, in which pontifical documents are cited and the author defended against Daniel Concina, Giovanni Vincenzo Patuzzi, and others. The third edition (Benevento, 1717) contains a treatise in which appeal to a future council is declared illegal when the pope has spoken and the Church, spread over the entire world, has accepted his judgment; which is supported by the testimony of the oecumenical councils and by the assemblies of the French clergy.

References

Attribution
 The entry cites:
Sommervogel, Bibl. de la C. de J.; 
Feller, Dict. hist. (Paris, 1838); 
Viva, Opera (Ferrara, 1757); 
Menolog. S.J., 5 July.

External links 
 

1648 births
1726 deaths
17th-century Italian Jesuits
18th-century Italian Roman Catholic theologians
18th-century Italian Jesuits
17th-century Italian Roman Catholic theologians